John Walter Shanahan (January 3, 1846 – February 19, 1916) was an American prelate of the Roman Catholic Church. He served as bishop of the Diocese of Harrisburg in Pennsylvania from 1899 until his death in 1916.

Biography

Early life 
John Shanahan was born in Silver Lake, Pennsylvania, to John and Margaret (née Donovan) Shanahan, who immigrated to the United States from County Cork, Ireland. He studied at St. Charles Borromeo Seminary in Philadelphia.

Shanahan was ordained to the priesthood for the Archdiocese of Philadelphia by his brother, Bishop Jeremiah F. Shanahan, on January 2, 1869. He served as superintendent of Catholic schools in the archdiocese.

Bishop of Harrisburg 
On January 2, 1899, Shanahan was appointed the third bishop of the Diocese of Harrisburg by Pope Leo XIII. He received his episcopal consecration on May 1, 1899, from Archbishop Patrick Ryan, with Bishops Ignatius Horstmann and Edmond Prendergast serving as co-consecrators. His brother Jeremiah was the first to hold that office, serving between 1868 and his death in 1886.

During his 16-year-long tenure, Shanahan erected 27 new parishes and increased the number of priests from 74 to 120. He opened an orphanage for girls at Sylvan Heights and a protectory for boys at Abbottstown, Pennsylvania, and completed construction on the Cathedral of St. Patrick in 1907. In 1907 he founded the Sisters of Saint Casimir. He also established the motherhouses of the Sisters of the Most Precious Blood and the Sisters of Saints Cyril and Methodius, and invited to the diocese the Franciscan Sisters of Saint Joseph and the Immaculate Heart Sisters of Scranton.

John Shanahan died on February 19, 1916, at age 70.

References

1846 births
1916 deaths
People from Susquehanna County, Pennsylvania
Roman Catholic bishops of Harrisburg
19th-century Roman Catholic bishops in the United States
20th-century Roman Catholic bishops in the United States
St. Charles Borromeo Seminary alumni